The Roman mausoleum of Córdoba is an  ancient structure in the Jardines de la Victoria, Córdoba, Andalusia, southern Spain. It is a funerary monument of cylinder-shaped  that corresponded to a group of funerary monuments of the Republican era, built in the 1st century AD. It was discovered in 1993 during archaeological excavations.

It includes the chamber tomb that housed the Urn, as well as remains of the basement, cornices, and crenellated parapet. Unusual for such structures in Roman Iberia, it may have been designed by an Italian architect, due to similarities to other mausoleums in Rome and the rest of Italy. Its size also suggests that it belonged to a wealthy family.

The mausoleum is located near the road that connected the ancient city with Hispalis (now Seville), and exited from the city by the western gate, or "Porta Principalis Sinistra" (Puerta de Gallegos). The archaeological site also includes remains of the pavement of the latter.

References

External links

 Roman mausoleums of "Puerta Gallegos" in Córdoba

Cordoba
Buildings and structures in Córdoba, Spain
History of Córdoba, Spain
Buildings and structures completed in the 1st century
1st-century establishments in the Roman Empire
1993 archaeological discoveries